The 1990 Tour de Suisse was the 54th edition of the Tour de Suisse cycle race and was held from 13 June to 22 June 1990. The race started in Winterthur and finished in Zürich. The race was won by Sean Kelly of the PDM team.

General classification

References

1990
Tour de Suisse